Deerfield Township is a township in Kearny County, Kansas, USA.  As of the 2000 census, its population was 1,104.

Geography
Deerfield Township covers an area of 46.49 square miles (120.4 square kilometers); of this, 0.31 square miles (0.8 square kilometers) or 0.66 percent is water.

Cities and towns
 Deerfield

Adjacent townships
 East Hibbard Township (north)
 Sherlock Township, Finney County (southeast)
 Southside Township (south)
 Lakin Township (west)

Cemeteries
The township contains one cemetery, Deer Field.

Major highways
 U.S. Route 50

References
 U.S. Board on Geographic Names (GNIS)
 United States Census Bureau cartographic boundary files

External links
 US-Counties.com
 City-Data.com

Townships in Kearny County, Kansas
Townships in Kansas